Progress 28 was a Soviet uncrewed Progress cargo spacecraft, which was launched in March 1987 to resupply the Mir space station.

Launch
Progress 28 launched on 3 March 1987 from the Baikonur Cosmodrome in the Kazakh SSR. It used a Soyuz-U2 rocket.

Docking
Progress 28 docked with the aft port of the Mir Core Module on 5 March 1987 at 12:42:36 UTC, and was undocked on 26 March 1987 at 05:06:48 UTC.

Decay
It remained in orbit until 28 March 1987, when it was deorbited. The deorbit burn occurred at 03:01:01 UTC and the mission ended at 03:49 UTC.

See also

 1987 in spaceflight
 List of Progress missions
 List of uncrewed spaceflights to Mir

References

Progress (spacecraft) missions
1987 in the Soviet Union
Spacecraft launched in 1987
Spacecraft which reentered in 1987
Spacecraft launched by Soyuz-U rockets